Julien Vanzeebroeck (born 7 July 1946) is a Belgian former professional Grand Prix motorcycle road racer. He made his Grand Prix debut in 1974, racing in the 50cc class. His best years were in 1974 and 1975, finishing third in the 50cc world championship both years.

References

1946 births
Living people
Belgian motorcycle racers
50cc World Championship riders
125cc World Championship riders